Five ships of the United States Navy have been named USS Helena, after the city of Helena, Montana, though only four were completed.

  was a gunboat in service from 1897 to 1932.
  was a  light cruiser, commissioned in 1939, that saw heavy action in the Solomon Islands during World War II, ultimately being sunk in the Battle of Kula Gulf in July 1943.
  was a planned  light cruiser canceled in 1944 while under construction.
  was a  heavy cruiser commissioned in 1945, active in the Korean War, and decommissioned in 1963.
  is a  nuclear attack submarine commissioned in 1987 and currently in active service.

See also
 , a patrol boat in commission from 1917 to 1919

United States Navy ship names